The following page lists all power stations in Azerbaijan.

Renewable energy

Hydroelectric power stations in Azerbaijan

Photovoltaic power stations

Non-renewable energy

Thermal power stations

See also 

 Energy law
 List of power stations in Asia
 List of power stations in Europe
 List of largest power stations in the world

References

External links

 Area.gov.az - Official website of the State Agency for Alternative and Renewable Energy Sources 
 Mie.gov.az - Official website of the Ministry of Energy of Azerbaijan 
 Azerenerji.gov.az - Official website of Azerenerji JSC 

Azerbaijan

Power stations